Jorge Inocêncio Pereira Dias (born 8 May 1993 in Lisbon) is a Portuguese footballer who plays for C.D. Trofense  as a  midfielder.

Football career
On 29 July 2012, Inocêncio made his professional debut with Trofense in a 2012–13 Taça da Liga match against Aves.

References

External links

Stats and profile at LPFP 

1993 births
Living people
Footballers from Lisbon
Portuguese footballers
Association football midfielders
Liga Portugal 2 players
C.D. Trofense players